Following are institutes located in Gujrat, Pakistan

Institutes
 Sky Vision High School Majra Shamali
 The Punjab Schools Kotla Campus
 International School of Cordoba
 Government Boy's Primaryschool, Nathuwal
 Government Girl's Primary school, Nathuwal
 Inzimam Ul Haq High School, Majra Shamali, Karianwala
 Dar-e-Arqam Schools
 The Educators
Mukabbir University of Science and Technology
 Govt. High School, Gochh
 Wisdom Degree College (Channan, Dinga)
 Lahore Grammar School
 Al Hijaz Secondary School, Khambi
 The Chenab School, Boys & Girls
 Govt. Public High School No.2 Railway Rd, Gujrat
 Jinnah Public School, JPS Hafiz Hayat
 Public Model School, Railway Rd, Gujrat
 Govt.Comprehensive School, Servis Morr.
 Govt. Zamindara School
 BSS Gujrat Campus
 Iiui School (Shere Rabani Campus)
 Wisdom House Channan Campus, Dinga
 Wisdom House (Jorah Maina Chak Campus, Kharian)
 Wisdom House (Baharwal Campus, Kharian)
 Wisdom House (Chailianwala Campus, Dinga)
 Aspire collage (gujrat campus, gujrat)
 Wisdom House (Sikeryali Campus, Kharian)
 Wisdom House (Keeranwali Campus, Gujrat)
 Wisdom House (Mirza Tahir Campus, Kharian)
 Wisdom House (Dithewal Campus, Gujrat)
 Danish International Grammar School, Dudhray Sharqi
 Danish International Grammar School, Jalal Pur Jattan
 Danish International Grammar School(Dudhray Sharqi, jpj)
 Ilm College Gujrat campus
Mukabbir College Gujrat

References 

Gujrat
Universities and colleges in Gujrat District
Gujrat
Education in Gujrat, Pakistan